Bogle Township is a township in Gentry County, in the U.S. state of Missouri.

Bogle Township was named after a pioneer citizen.

References

Townships in Missouri
Townships in Gentry County, Missouri